Frank R. Kschischang (born 15 September 1962 in Mettmann, West Germany is a professor in the Department of Electrical and Computer Engineering at the University of Toronto, and holds a Canada Research Chair in communication algorithms. He is a co-inventor of the factor graph, a kind of graphical model used in Bayesian inference.

Prof. Kschischang is a Fellow of the IEEE, "for contributions to trellis structures, graphical models and iterative decoding techniques for error-correcting codes." He is also a Fellow of the Engineering Institute of Canada, and is a recipient of the 2010 Killam Research Fellowship. He received the 2023 IEEE Richard W. Hamming Medal, the 2012 Canadian Award for Telecommunications Research, and the 2016 Aaron D. Wyner Distinguished Service Award. From 2014 to 2016, Prof. Kschischang served as Editor-in-Chief of the IEEE Transactions on Information Theory.

References

External links
 Prof. Kschischang's home page

Canadian engineers
Academic staff of the University of Toronto
Living people
1962 births
Canada Research Chairs
Fellows of the Engineering Institute of Canada
People from Mettmann
Engineers from Toronto
University of Toronto alumni